Zakaria Pintoo (born 1 January 1943) is a retired Bangladeshi footballer who played as a defender.

Career
Pintoo played for the Pakistan football team before independence.

He served as the captain of Shadhin Bangla Football Team in 1971 and went on to become the first captain of the Bangladesh national football team after the independence of the country. He received the Independence Day Award (1995) in the sports category by the Government of Bangladesh. During tour with the Shadhin Bangla Football Team in India, in 1971, he became the first person to hoist the Bangladesh flag in foreign land. In May 1972, Pintoo captained Dhaka Mohammedan against visiting Indian club Mohun Bagan in their 1–0 defeat.

Pintoo led the Bangladesh football team in their first international tournament at the 1973 Merdeka Tournament. He made his international debut for Bangladesh against Thailand football team.

Bangladesh Football Federation (BFF) president, Kazi Salahuddin, alleged that Pintoo asked him for funds to withdraw the nomination paper of the president post in the 2012 BFF election. The allegation was later denied by Pintoo.

Family
Pintoo's younger brother Moyeenuddin is also a former footballer.

Honours
Dhaka Wanderers
Dhaka League: 1960

Mohammedan SC (Dhaka)
Dhaka League: 1961, 1963, 1965, 1966, 1969, 1975
Independence Cup: 1972
Aga Khan Gold Cup: 1964, 1968

Awards and accolades
1978 − National Sports Awards.
 1995 − Independence Day Award

See also
 List of association footballers who have been capped for two senior national teams

References

Bibliography
   

Living people
1943 births
People from Naogaon District
Bangladeshi footballers
Bangladesh international footballers
Association football defenders
Recipients of the Independence Day Award
Recipients of the Bangladesh National Sports Award
Pakistani footballers
Pakistan international footballers
Dual internationalists (football)
Mohammedan SC (Dhaka) players